The Los Gatos-Saratoga Union High School District (formerly Los Gatos-Saratoga Joint Union High School District) is a high school district in the greater San Jose, California, U.S. area.  It operates two high schools, and is ranked the Best School District in California.

Note: student count based on 2020 state report. FTE & ratio based on current U.S. News & World Report profile.

The school district serves residents of the Saratoga Union School District, the Lakeside Joint School District, the Los Gatos Union School District, and the Loma Prieta Joint Union Elementary School District.

See also

Los Gatos Union School District
Saratoga Union School District

References

External links
Los Gatos-Saratoga Joint Union High School District

School districts in Santa Clara County, California